The Church of the Living God – Jewell Dominion, also known as The Church of the Living God, The Pillar and Ground of the Truth, Which He Purchased With His Own Blood, Inc., was founded by mother Mary Magdalena Lewis Tate in 1903. It was incorporated in 1908 and held its first convocation in June of that year in Greenville, Alabama. Tate, affectionately known as "Mother Tate", along with her sons Walter Curtis Lewis and Felix Early Lewis, erected churches in Illinois, Alabama, and Georgia during the first ten years of the church's existence.

Currently, the Jewell dominion has over 38 churches worldwide.

Present Leadership
SIXTH CHIEF OVERSEER

Our current leader, Bishop Dr. Calvin Worthem was appointed as General Overseer/Senior Bishop of the Church of the Living God – Jewell Dominion on July 24, 2022.

Past Leadership
FIRST CHIEF OVERSEER

BISHOP MARY TATE/FOUNDING BISHOP

SECOND CHIEF OVERSEER

The Second Overseer Bishop B. L. McLeod was duly elected in 1931. He was a spirit-filled man who continued to travel and establish the Church works in many cities and states, both north and south. Bishop McLeod was the Overseer from 1931 – 1936 the time of his death, his faithful and devoted wife Bishop Mattie Lou McLeod, who had worked right by his side in the Gospel work and had traveled extensively with, Mother Mary Magdalena Tate, was elected Third Overseer.

THIRD CHIEF OVERSEER

Bishop Mattie Lou McLeod (who was later Bishop Mattie Lou Jewell) was duly elected in 1939 by the General Assembly in Nashville, Tennessee. She founded Jewell’s Academy and Seminary, which operated from 1950- 1 962. It was a Church educational institution serving grades kindergarten through high school, as well as a veteran’s program.

Being a servant of God, directed by the Holy Spirit, Bishop Jewell was led to seek out a new location for the Headquarters of The Church of the Living God, The Pillar and Ground of the Truth, Which He Purchased With His Own Blood, Inc. In 1964 she purchased property at 3359 North Ruckle Street, Indianapolis, Indiana as the location for the Church Headquarters.

FOURTH CHIEF OVERSEER

Bishop Naomi Aquilla Manning was the Fourth Overseer of The Church of the Living God, The Pillar and Ground of the Truth, Which He Purchased With His Own Blood, Inc. (Chief Jewell Dominion). Her education began at Jewell’s Academy in Nashville, Tennessee. At the age of sixteen, Bishop Manning graduated from Dwight Merrow High School in Englewood, New Jersey. She also attended Farleigh Dickinson University in Rutherford, New Jersey, and received her theological training under the watchful eyes of Bishop Jewell–our great leader–and the dynamic theologian Bishop L. L. Harrison.

Bishop N. A. Manning has been trained and prepared for the role of General Overseer for most of her life. She has worked in the Church since a child, singing and traveling with a Gospel group. She was the Second Assistant Overseer from 1964 until 1986 under Bishop M. L. Jewell, before becoming Assistant Overseer upon the passing of her father the late Bishop L. L. Harrison in 1986. In 1991, Bishop Manning was installed as the President of The Church of the Living God. Under her administration, “Emeritus Awards” (reduction of dues for members 70 and older) have been established, seminars have been held to better educate people who hold offices in the Church, and Sunday School books have been issued for study and inspirational learning. Dr. Manning passed May 4, 2003.

FIFTH CHIEF OVERSEER

Bishop Faye Moore was born in the state of Mississippi in 1928. She was a life-long member of the Church of the Living God and was raised by strong, God-fearing, and faithful parents who were involved in Church leadership until their demise. Bishop Moore was appointed as Senior Bishop/General Overseer of the Church of the Living God – Jewell Dominion on June 12, 2005. She worked fervently throughout her appointment to increase the growth of the Church spiritually, physically, financially, and geographically.

Prior to becoming Senior Bishop/General Overseer, Bishop Moore served as Chairman of the Board of Directors, as well as spearheaded our annual Youth Church Bible Quiz events. She taught Sunday Bible School and Biblical workshops for the National Headquarters for many years and, under the past leadership, established the first Sunday School Books for the Church of the Living God – Jewell Dominion. Her workshop classes were always exciting because of her enthusiastic style of teaching. She was also very active as Chaplain of the Camp Jewell ministry (a Church-owned summer camp for all young people).

On a personal note, Bishop Moore established the first black-owned foster care service in the Macomb County of Michigan and was heavily involved in prison ministry for many years.

It was always her desire to be self-employed, and she was a scholar for raising money to support the Church and youth ministries. This self-taught woman of God could always be found reading and studying her Bible and other books to build up her knowledge and supplement her God-given wisdom.

Bishop Moore was an advocate for young people and has spent many years working to raise funds to support youth programs and trips; and she witnessed so many while selling hot dogs and soda pops in areas where most men and women would never dare to go. She never feared what might happen to her but always remained focused on what God had placed in her heart to do for the upbuilding of His kingdom on earth.

Bishop Moore has never met a stranger or anyone who was insignificant or worthless in her eyes but has stretched forth her hands and arms of love to all people, believing in her heart that God made everyone equal. She stood on this platform in her administration – “Everybody is somebody in God’s eyes!”

She was a giving leader who continued to lead the people of God with loving kindness and tender mercy as she exhorted and taught them how to work together in the spirit of love and give God their very best.

Bishop Moore was called home to be with The Lord on Saturday, April 9, 2022.

References

Churches in Alabama